Francis Edward Ifield OAM (born 30 November 1937) is a British-Australian country music singer and guitarist who often incorporated yodelling into his music. After living in Australia, Ifield returned to the United Kingdom in November 1959 where he had four number-one hits on the UK Singles Chart with his cover versions of "I Remember You" (May 1962), "Lovesick Blues" (December), "The Wayward Wind" (March 1963) and "Confessin' That I Love You" (September). In 2003, Ifield was inducted into the Australian Roll of Renown. Ifield was inducted into the ARIA Hall of Fame at the ARIA Music Awards of 2007. In 1986 he contracted pneumonia, which resulted in removal of part of a lung and damage to his vocal cords. He relocated to Sydney in 1988 and was unable to sing or yodel for years as he recovered. In June 2009 he was presented with the Medal of the Order of Australia, "For service to the arts as an entertainer". He was first married to Gillian Bowden (1965–88) and the couple had two children. His second marriage was to Carole Wood (1992–present). In 2005 he co-wrote his autobiography, I Remember Me: the First 25 Years, with Pauline Halford.

Career

Early years
Frank Ifield was born in 1937 in Coundon, Coventry, England, to Australian parents Richard Joseph Ifield (1909–1982) and Hannah Muriel Ifield (c. 1916–2012), as one of seven sons. His parents had travelled to England in 1936, where his father was an inventor and engineer who created the Ifield fuel pump, for Lucas Industries, which was used in jet aircraft.

The Ifield family returned to Australia in January 1948 aboard the Orion. It was a rural district and he listened to hillbilly music (later called country music) while milking the family's cow. He was given a guitar in 1949 by his grandmother and was self-taught; he also taught himself to yodel, by imitating country stars, including Hank Snow.

The family moved to Beecroft, a Sydney suburb. At the age of 13 he performed his version of Bill Showmet's "Did You See My Daddy Over There?" and appeared on local radio station 2GB's talent quest, Amateur Hour. This track was issued as his first single, in 1953, by Regal Zonophone Records. By November of that year he appeared regularly on Brisbane radio station, 4BK's Youth Parade, playing guitar and singing, where, "All the artists in this programme are under 21 year of age."

His third single was a cover version of "Abdul Abulbul Amir" (September 1954), which was backed by his own composition, "A Mother's Faith". In 1956 he hosted, Campfire Favourites, on local TV station, TCN-9, which "was the first weekly 'Western' programme by a local artist on Australian television." From that year to late 1957 he recorded six singles with a backing group, Dick Carr Buckaroos.

In 1957 he recorded a track, "Whiplash", which was used as the theme song for the British/Australian TV series of the same title from September 1960 to mid-1961. He toured the North Island of New Zealand in early 1959, where his single, "Guardian Angel", reached No. 1 on local radio charts. Ifield had two top 30 hits in that year on the Kent Music Report, with "True" (September, No. 26) and "Teenage Baby" (November, No. 23). He returned to the United Kingdom in November 1959.

1960s success

Ifield's first UK single, "Lucky Devil" (January 1960), reached No. 22 in the UK Singles Chart. His next six singles had less commercial success, but he had his first UK number-one hit with a cover version of Victor Schertzinger and Johnny Mercer 1941 composition, "I Remember You" (May 1962), which topped the charts for seven weeks. Known for Ifield's falsetto and a slight yodel, it was the second-highest-selling single of that year in the UK, and became the seventh million-selling single. It is Ifield's highest charting single on the United States Billboard Hot 100, reaching No. 5. It also reached No. 1 on the Australian Kent Music Report.

His next single was a double A-side, "Lovesick Blues" and "She Taught Me How to Yodel" (October 1962). "Lovesick Blues" was originally sung by Hank Williams and was treated in an upbeat "Let's Twist Again" style. The other track is a virtuoso piece of yodelling with the final verse – entirely yodelling – at double-speed. It also peaked at No. 1 in the UK, No. 2 in Australia, and reached No. 44 in the US Billboard Hot 100. He had been told by his management not to yodel because it would brand him. Nevertheless, he sang "She Taught Me to Yodel" as an encore for a Royal Variety Performance (November 1962), at the specific request of the Queen Mother for a yodelling song. His next single, "Wayward Wind", made him the first UK-based artist to reach No. 1 three times in succession on the UK charts. The only previous artist to have done so was Elvis Presley. In Australia it peaked at No. 16.

His UK charting singles from 1963 were "Nobody's Darlin' but Mine" (April 1963, No. 4), "Confessin' (That I Love You)" (June, No. 1), "Mule Train" (October, No. 22) and "Don't Blame Me" (December, No. 8). In 1963 he sang at the Grand Ole Opry, introduced by one of his heroes, Hank Snow. Many of his records were produced by Norrie Paramor. Ifield also was featured on Jolly What!, a 1964 compilation comprising eight of his tracks and four by the Beatles, which has been considered an attempt to cash in on Beatlemania. (Vee-Jay Records had gotten US distribution rights to The Beatles along with Ifield) Despite changing trends Ifield continued to have further top 40 hits in that decade including, "Angry at the Big Oak Tree" (April 1964) "I Should Care" (July), "Paradise" (August 1965), "No One Will Ever Know" (June 1966), and "Call Her Your Sweetheart" (September). Ifield twice entered the UK heats for the Eurovision Song Contest. He came in second in the 1962 heat with "Alone Too Long" (losing to Ronnie Carroll). In the 1976 heat he tried with, "Ain't Gonna Take no for an Answer", finishing last of 12.

Later years 
In 1991, Ifield returned to the UK chart when a dance remix of "She Taught Me How to Yodel", renamed, "The Yodelling Song", was billed as Frank Ifield featuring the Backroom Boys, reached No. 40 in the UK Singles Chart. In more than 30 years, it became his 16th appearance on that list. The song was mentioned by Victor Meldrew in the One Foot in the Grave episode, "Love and Death".

Personal life
Ifield married Gillian Bowden, a dancer at the London Palladium, on 6 July 1965 at Marylebone Register, London. Ifield starred as Dave Kelly, and Bowden appeared as a dancer, in the comedy musical film, Up Jumped a Swagman (December 1965).  The couple had two children.

In 1986, Ifield  contracted pneumonia and required surgery to remove part of a lung. As a result, his vocal cords were damaged, which meant he could not sing or yodel for years until they recovered. He and Bowden divorced in 1988 and he returned to Sydney to live. In 1992, he married his second wife, Carole Wood, an airline hostess.

Bibliography

Discography

Albums

Singles

Notes
A"It's My Time" peaked at No. 12 on the RPM Country Tracks chart in Canada.
BCredited to Frank Ifield featuring the Backroom Boys

Awards and honours
In June 2009, He was presented with a Medal of the Order of Australia, with a citation, "For service to the arts as an entertainer." 

On 10 June 2012 Ifield joined Paul Hazell on his World of Country show on the community radio station Uckfield FM. He discussed his life in music and forthcoming induction to the Coventry Music Wall of Fame. He made another appearance on Uckfield FM, talking with Tony Williams, on 16 May 2017.

Australian Roll of Renown
The Australian Roll of Renown honours Australian and New Zealander musicians who have shaped the music industry by making a significant and lasting contribution to Country Music. It was inaugurated in 1976 and the inductee is announced at the Country Music Awards of Australia in Tamworth in January. 

|-
| 2003
| Frank Ifield
| Australian Roll of Renown
|

ARIA Music Awards
The ARIA Music Awards is an annual awards ceremony that recognises excellence, innovation, and achievement across all genres of Australian music. They commenced in 1987. Ifield was inducted into the Hall of Fame in 2007.

|-
| ARIA Music Awards of 2007
| Frank Ifield
| ARIA Hall of Fame
|

Mo Awards
The Australian Entertainment Mo Awards (commonly known informally as the Mo Awards), were annual Australian entertainment industry awards. They recognise achievements in live entertainment in Australia from 1975 to 2016. Frank Ifield won one award in that time.
 (wins only)
|-
| 2009
| Frank Ifield 
| Hall of Fame 
| 
|-

References

External links 
 
 Frank Ifield with autograph seekers, 1962
 Frank Ifield discography from Music City
 Frank Ifield's Official Discography at Discoogle
 

1937 births
Living people
English country singers
English male singers
ARIA Award winners
ARIA Hall of Fame inductees
Musicians from Coventry
Yodelers
English emigrants to Australia
Columbia Graphophone Company artists
MAM Records artists
Vee-Jay Records artists
Australian country guitarists
Australian male singers
Australian country singers
English country guitarists
Acoustic guitarists
English male guitarists
Recipients of the Medal of the Order of Australia
Australian male guitarists